Kiss of the Spider Woman is a 1976 novel by Argentine writer Manuel Puig. It depicts the daily conversations between two cellmates in an Argentine prison, Molina and Valentín, and the intimate bond they form in the process. It is generally considered Puig's most successful work.

The novel's form is unusual in that there is no traditional narrative voice.  It is written in large part as dialogue, without any indication of who is speaking, except for a dash (-) to show a change of speaker. There are also significant portions of stream-of-consciousness writing. What is not written as dialogue or stream-of-consciousness is written as meta-fictional government documentation. The conversations between the characters, when not focused on the moment at hand, are recountings of films that Molina has seen, which act as a form of escape from their environment. Thus there are a main plot, several subplots, and five additional stories that comprise the novel.

Puig adapted the novel into a stage play in 1983, with an English translation by Allan Baker. It was also made into an Academy Award-winning film in 1985, a Broadway musical in 1993 and a 2020 television special episode of Katy Keene.

Historical background
Puig started Kiss of the Spider Woman in 1974 starting with Molina, who was an experiment in imagining a romantic female. From there the rest of the notes sprouted into the novel.
At first the only country that would publish the novel was Spain. Upon publication it was included on a list of novels that could not be consumed by the population of Buenos Aires, along with novels such as Aunt Julia and the Scriptwriter by Mario Vargas Llosa. Puig feared the publication of the novel would affect his family negatively. Despite this it was entered in the Frankfurt Book Fair. It remained banned until 1983 when the Raúl Alfonsín government took control.
The English translation of the book was started even before its official publication in Spanish in 1976. Some of the translation proved problematic for Puig including Molina's speech which he could not get to portray the proper sentimental aspects of the voice. The English translation appeared in 1979.
The French translation also proved problematic as the publisher edited out some scenes for their explicit nature.
In 1981, Kiss of the Spider Woman won the best Latin American novel of the year from Istituto Italo Latino Americano in Italy.

Plot
Two prisoners, Luis Molina and Valentín Arregui, share a cell in a Buenos Aires prison. The story takes place between September 9, 1975 and October 8, 1975. Molina is in jail for "corruption of a minor", while Valentín is a political prisoner who is part of a revolutionary group trying to overthrow the government. The two characters, seemingly opposites in every way, form an intimate bond in their cell, and their relationship changes both of them in profound ways. Molina recounts various films he has seen to Valentín in order to help them forget their situation.

Toward the middle of the novel, the reader finds out that Molina is actually a spy planted in Valentín's cell to befriend him and try to extract information about his organization. Molina gets provisions from the outside for his cooperation with the officials in the hopes of keeping up appearances that his mother comes to visit him (thus giving him a reason to leave the cell when he reports to the warden). It is through his general acts of kindness to Valentín that the two fall into a romance and become lovers, albeit briefly. For his cooperation, Molina is paroled. On the day he leaves, Valentín asks Molina to take a message to his revolutionary group on the outside. Little does he know that he is also being followed by secret police trying to find the location of the group.

Molina dies after being shot by Valentín's group at the rendezvous point after the secret police disrupt the assignation. The novel ends in Valentín's consciousness, after he has been given an anesthetic following torture, in which he imagines himself sailing away with his beloved Marta.

The First Film
The first story Molina recounts, which opens the novel, is based on the movie Cat People (1942). During the narration, the reader finds out that Valentín sympathizes with the secretary because of his long-lost love, Marta.

The Second Film
The second story Molina recounts is based on a Nazi propaganda film. Unlike the first, it is unclear whether or not this is an actual movie, but may be a composite of multiple Nazi films and an American film called Paris Underground (1945).

In the film, a French woman falls in love with a noble Aryan officer and then dies in his arms after being shot by the French resistance. The film is a clear piece of Nazi propaganda, but Molina's disinclination to see past its superficial charms is a symptom of his alienation from society, or at least his choice to disengage from the world that has rejected him.

The Third Film
The third story Molina recounts, based on the film The Enchanted Cottage (1945), is the only film Molina does not tell Valentín; instead he recites it to himself. It concerns an Air Force pilot, disfigured by war wounds, who secludes himself in a cottage. The cottage's homely maid eventually falls in love with and then marries the pilot. They discover that their love has transformed them — he appears handsome to her and she beautiful to him. Their transformation is only perceived by the two lovers and the audience.

The Fourth Film
The fourth film concerns a young revolutionary with a penchant for racing cars who meets a sultry older woman and whose father is later kidnapped by guerrillas. With his paramour's aid the boy attempts to rescue his father, who ends up dying in a shootout with police. Disillusioned, the young boy joins the guerrillas.

The Fifth Film
Based on the film I Walked with a Zombie (1943), the fifth story concerns a rich man who marries a woman and brings her to his island home. There his new bride discovers a witch doctor who has the ability to turn people into zombies. It is eventually revealed that the man's first wife was seduced by the witch doctor and turned into a zombie. Reunited with his first wife, the man proclaims his love for his first wife, but is ultimately killed by the witch doctor.

The Sixth Film
The sixth film Molina recounts is a love story in which a newspaper man falls in love with the wife of a Mafia boss. Lovestruck, he stops his newspaper from running a potentially damaging story about the woman. They run away together but are unable to support themselves. When the man falls ill, his lover prostitutes herself so they can survive. Valentín is forced to finish the story despite Molina recounting it. In the end, the man dies and the woman ends up sailing away.

Characters
 Molina – One of the protagonists and the prime storyteller. A homosexual man (using the novel's parlance) who has been jailed for "corrupting a minor."
 Valentín – The other protagonist, and the main implied listener. He is a revolutionary, imprisoned for belonging to a leftist organization that is trying to overthrow the government.
 The Warden – One of the antagonists in the novel; he sets up Molina to spy and retrieve information from Valentín, and receives regular reports from him.
 Gabriel – The waiter whom Molina befriends; he acts as Molina's main love interest throughout the novel.
 Marta – Marta is Valentín's love interest, whom he lost in order to maintain a serious commitment to his revolutionary organization. She only appears in memories and streams-of-consciousness in the novel.
 The prison guard
 Molina's mother

Criticism
The novel received mixed reviews. The Hudson Review stated that "Puig is a master of narrative craftsmanship" (1979), while The New York Times Book Review asserted that "Other than these film synopses, there's not much here". Rita Felski, in The Uses of Literature, has argued for an interpretation of Kiss of the Spider Woman as "an exercise in aesthetic re-education," a reading that is indicative of the principles she has laid out in her vision of postcritique.

Themes
The author includes a long series of footnotes on the psychoanalytic theory of homosexuality. The footnotes act largely as a representation of Puig's political intention in writing the novel: to present an objective view of homosexuality. The footnotes include both factual information and that given by the fictional Anelli Taub. The footnotes tend to appear at moments of misunderstanding between Molina and Valentín.<ref>Levine, Suzanne Jill. Manuel Puig and the Spider Woman'. page 258.</ref> The extended notes deepen the novel's experimental nature while clarifying the book's challenge to traditional psychoanalytic views of homosexuality. However, the two levels, the literary one of the dialogue and the one of the footnotes, proceed hand in hand, aiming at the same goal, an objective that the author deliberately leaves open to the interpretation of the reader.

Notes

References
 Levine, Suzanne Jill. Manuel Puig and the Spider Woman: His Life and Fictions. New York: Farrar, Straus and Giroux. 2000. Print.
 Tittler, Jonathan. Manuel Puig. New York: Twayne Publishers. 1993. Print.
 Kerr, Lucille. Suspended Fictions: Reading Novels by Manuel Puig''. Chicago: University of Illinois Press, 1987. Print.

1976 novels
Argentine LGBT novels
Novels with gay themes
Novels by Manuel Puig
Argentine novels adapted into films
Novels set in Buenos Aires
1970s LGBT novels
Novels with transgender themes
Seix Barral books